Dieida ledereri is a species of moth of the family Cossidae. It is found in Iran, Syria, Israel and Turkey.

Adults have been recorded on wing in March in Israel.

References

Moths described in 1871
Cossinae
Moths of Europe
Moths of Asia